Miloš Soboňa (born 25 November 1975) is a former Slovak international football defender who played for clubs in Slovakia and Turkey.

Career
Born in Levice, Soboňa began playing football for the youth team of local side of Slovan Levice. He started playing for the youth team of ŠK Slovan Bratislava in 1991 and would join the senior side in 1993. He would win four Slovak championships and three Slovak Cups with the club.

In September 2001, Soboňa moved to Turkey where he would make 10 Süper Lig appearances in a brief stint with Bursaspor. He returned to Slovakia to play two more seasons with FC Artmedia Petržalka before retiring.

Soboňa made three appearances for the senior Slovakia national football team, including one 2002 FIFA World Cup qualifying match.

References

External links
 
 
 
 
 Profile at Turksports.net

1975 births
Living people
Slovak footballers
Slovakia international footballers
ŠK Slovan Bratislava players
FC Petržalka players
Bursaspor footballers

Association football defenders
People from Levice
Sportspeople from the Nitra Region